Aqua5 (often stylized as AQUA5) was a J-pop group affiliated with the Takarazuka Revue. When the group was formed, all five members were otokoyaku (performers of male roles) in the Revue's Snow Troupe. They made their debut on August 25, 2007, at the opening ceremony of the IAAF World Championships in Osaka, Japan.

The group has officially disbanded since April 2010 and their last appearance together was on the show Tokyo Friend Park 2 on 5 April 2010. It was noted on the show itself that it was to be their final appearance as a group. It was also mentioned in the Takarazuka Graph April 2010 issue in an interview with the five member that the article would be AQUA5's last job.

The group's name is based on part of Natsuki Mizu's name (水夏希), which translates to "water".

On June 9, 2009, the group had their first live concert, performing for 1300 fans in Akasaka, Tokyo. However, only four of the members participated, as Kaname Ouki had been recently injured in rehearsals.

Members 
 Natsuki Mizu (lead)
 Mao Ayabuki
 Kei Otozuki
 Oto Ayana
 Kaname Ouki

Discography and releases

Singles

Albums

DVDs

Television Appearances 
 NHK Kayo Concert - December 4, 2007
 Utaban - December 12, 2007; December 11, 2008
 Tokyo Friend Park 2 - February 23, 2009; April 5, 2010

External links 
 Official AQUA5 website (Japanese)
 Artist profile on oricon.co.jp (Japanese)

References 

Japanese girl groups
Japanese pop music groups
Takarazuka Revue
Musical groups disestablished in 2010
Musical groups established in 2007
2007 establishments in Japan
2010 disestablishments in Japan
Musical groups from Hyōgo Prefecture
Musical quintets